The 1955–56 British Home Championship was a football tournament played during the 1955–56 season between the British Home Nations. It was the only occasion during the hundred-year run of the Home Championship in which all four teams finished level on points. As goal difference was not used to determine position until 1979, all four teams shared the trophy, holding it for three months each. Had goal difference been used to determine the winner, then England would have won with Scotland second.

The competition began unusually with victories by underdogs Wales and Ireland over England and Scotland in their opening matches. This gave added incentive to the favourites in the following matches, which England and Scotland both won easily. Nevertheless, all four teams stood a good chance of victory going into the final round, with both Wales and Ireland seeking a rare undisputed tournament success. However the teams cancelled each other out, both matches resulting in 1–1 draws leaving all four equal on points and thus sharing the trophy.

Table

Results

References

1951
1955–56 in Northern Ireland association football
1955–56 in English football
1955–56 in Scottish football
1955–56 in Welsh football
1956 in British sport
1955 in British sport